Eustis may refer to:

People
Abraham Eustis, American Army officer and lawyer
Charles Eustis Bohlen (1904–1974), American ambassador
Collin Eustis, American Cyber Security Expert
Dorothy Harrison Eustis, dog breeder and philanthropist
George Eustis Jr. (1828–1872), United States Representative from Louisiana
James Biddle Eustis, United States Senator from Louisiana
Oskar Eustis (1958-), United States theatre director 
William Eustis, (1753–1825), early American statesman
William Corcoran Eustis (1862–1921), American Army captain
William Henry Eustis (1845–1928), American mayor of Minneapolis

Places
In the United States:
Eustis, Florida
Eustis, Maine
Eustis, Nebraska
Fort Eustis, United States military base located in Newport News, Virginia 
Lake Eustis, lake in Central Florida near the towns of Eustis and Tavares